Gesonula mundata is a species of short-horned grasshopper in the family Acrididae. It is found in Southeast Asia and Oceania.

Subspecies
These subspecies belong to the species Gesonula mundata:
 Gesonula mundata laosana (Rehn, 1952)
 Gesonula mundata mundata (Walker, 1870) (Common Gesonula)
 Gesonula mundata pulchra (Rehn, 1909)
 Gesonula mundata vietnamensis Storozhenko, 1992
 Gesonula mundata zonocera (Navás, 1904)

References

External links

 

Oxyinae